Tale Spinners for Children was a series of stories and novels adapted for young audiences on vinyl records in the early 1960s. They included a collection of old fairy tales, folklore, literary classics such as Don Quixote and Robinson Crusoe, and time-honored fables, with the title role sometimes played by a renowned theatrical actor or actress. (Many of the actors who appeared, however, such as Maggie Smith or Alec McCowen, became more famous for other roles years after the albums were released, and some of the actors, such as Donald Pleasence, who played Don Quixote, or John Wood, who played several villainous roles, were not even identified on the album covers.) The series gave children an exposure to timeless classic stories.

Originally only 30 records were pressed in England and France and sold as Atlas Talespinners under the Atlas Record label, and included an easy to follow story booklet. Within a few years, these records were introduced to the U.S. as Tale Spinners for Children under the United Artists Records label. What was known as the Atlas Theatre Company in England was marketed as the Famous Theatre Company in the United States. The story booklets were not included in the U.S. releases.

UA continued to produce more stories records until the early 1970s, and distribute them in the Canadian and Australian markets as well.

With popular children's record companies like Walt Disney Records already on the market, a host of other record companies followed: Mercury Storyteller series, Telegeneral Let's Pretend, Riverside Wonderland and Pathways of Sound.

Selected discography

United Artists Series

 Robin Hood  - Robert Hardy UAC 11001
 William Tell - Paul Daneman UAC 11002
 Snow White - Marjorie Westbury UAC 11003
 Cinderella - Marjorie Westbury UAC 11004
 The Knights of the Round Table - Derek Hart UAC 11005
 Sleeping Beauty - Denise Bryer UAC 11006
 The Three Musketeers -  Robert Hardy UAC 11007
 The Ugly Duckling - Denise Bryer UAC 11008
 Puss in Boots UAC 11009
 The Story of Chopin - Robert Hardy UAC 11010
 The Nutcracker Suite - Denise Bryer UAC 11011
 Little Red Riding Hood - Judith Stott UAC 11012
 Treasure Island - James Kennedy UAC 11013
 Pinocchio - Maggie Smith UAC 11014
 Robinson Crusoe - Alec McCowen UAC 11015
 Nursery Rhymes - UAC 11016
 The Pied Piper & The Tinder Box - Denise Bryer UAC 11017
 Ali Baba and the 40 Thieves - Denise Bryer UAC 11018
 Aladdin and the Magic Lamp - Denise Bryer UAC 11019
 Sinbad the Sailor - Derek Hart UAC 110020

 The Emperor's New Clothes & Hop-o'-My-Thumb - Frank Luther (Englishman, not the popular American narrator) UAC 11021
 The Story of Mozart - Alec McCowen UAC 11022
 The Story of Beethoven - William Devlin UAC 11023
 Gulliver in Lilliput - Derek Hart UAC 11024
 Don Quixote - Donald Pleasence UAC 11025
 The Story of the Old Testament, Part One - James McKenchie and John Wood UAC 11026
 Gilbert and Sullivan's The Mikado - Frank Luther (Englishman, not the popular American narrator) UAC 11027 with The New Modern Music Theatre Company
 Bluebeard - Marjorie Westbury  UAC 11028
 Alice in Wonderland - Denise Bryer UAC 11029
 Davy Crockett - Denise Bryer UAC 11030
 The Story of the Old Testament, Part Two - James McKechnie and John Wood UAC 11031
 Sing Along with Chipper and His Playmates - Henry LaPedus - UAC 11032
 Hansel and Gretel - UAC 11033
 Rip Van Winkle - UAC 11034
 Row, Row, Row Your Boat and Other Mother Goose Rhymes - UAC 11035
 Little Toot and Other Sea Songs - UAC 11036
 The Little Engine That Could & Jack and the Beanstalk - UAC 11037
 Thumbelina - John Scott, Ellen Hayes, Margo Shea, Bob Brown, The Ace Singers / Arthur Korb, John Stratter - UAC 11038
 Peter and the Wolf - UAC 11039
 Christopher Columbus - James McKechnie UAC 11040
 Mother Goose UAC 11041 Barrie Peter and John Thomas with the Hickory Dickory Singers and Orch. (High Fidelity)
 The Little Mermaid Denise Bryer UAC 11042
 Happy Birthday Party Time UAC 11043 Jack Johnson and the Hickory Dickory Players

 The Count of Monte Cristo - Paul Daneman UAC 11044
 Beauty and the Beast UAC 11045
 Baron Munchausen William Devlin UAC 11046
 Brave Little Tailor - Donald Pleasence UAC 11047
 The Story of Bach Derek Hart UAC 11048
 Sing Along With Humpty Dumpty UAC 11049 The Penguins and Orchestra
 God Bless Us All - John Chapman UAC 11050
 Golden Rhymes - Winnie Barrie UAC 11051  Hickery Dickery Players
 Western TV Favorites - Rex Hickock and His Rangers UAC 11052
 Peter Pan - Frank Gauna UAC 11053
 Hiawatha Jordan Malek UAC 11054
 Goldilocks and the Three Bears & The Three Little Pigs UAC 11055
 Wizard of Oz UAC 11056
 Daniel Boone UAC 11057
 The Silver Skates UAC 11058
 Swiss Family Robinson UAC 11059
 The Prince and the Pauper UAC 11060
 The Snow Queen UAC 11061
 Tom Thumb UAC 11062
 The Red Shoes UAC 11063
 Heidi UAC 11064
 King Midas & Rumpelstilskin UAC 11065
 Jack and the Beanstalk - The Regency Players  UAC 11067
 Aesop's Best Known Fables - The Regency Players  UAC 11068 (1969)
 Favorite Stories from Grimm's Fairy Tales - The Regency Players UAC 11069 (1969)
 Alphabet and Numbers UAC 11070
 Ring Around a Rosy UAC 110'] UAC 11072 Sunset
 Snow-White and Rose-Red & The Goose Girl - Herb Galewitz UAC 11073 Sunset
 The Gingerbread Man - The Regency Players UAC 11074 Sunset
 Tales from the Arabian Nights - The Regency Players UAC 11075 Sunset
 The Frog Princess - The Regency Players UAC 11076 Sunset
 Rudyard Kipling'''s Just So Stories - The Regency Players UAC 11077 Sunset
 The Owl and the Pussycat - Miss Kari UAC 11078 Sunset
 Funny Fairy Tales - The Regency Players UAC 11079	Sunset
 The Very Best Stories About Princesses UAC 11080 Sunset
 Macaroni the Little Pony - Frank Luther UAK 61

Atlas Talespinner Series
 Robin Hood - Robert Hardy EN 10-001
 The 3 Musketeers - Robert Hardy and The Atlas Theatre Company EN 10-002
 The Story of Bach	EN 10-003
 The Little Mermaid - Denise Bryer and The Atlas Theatre Company EN 10-004	Atlas
 Gulliver in Lilliput - Derek Hart and The Atlas Theatre Company EN 10-005
 The Story of the Old Testament, Part One - James McKechnie and The Atlas Theatre Company EN 10-006
 The Story of the Old Testament, Part Two - James McKechnie and The Atlas Theatre Company	EN 10-007
 Cinderella - Marjorie Westbury and The Atlas Theatre Company EN 10-008
 The Nutcracker Suite - Denise Bryer and The Atlas Theatre Company EN 10-009
 Christopher Columbus - James McKechnie and The Atlas Theatre Company EN 10-010
 The Knights of the Round Table - Derek Hart and The Atlas Theatre Company EN 10-011
 The Ugly Duckling - Denise Bryer and The Atlas Theatre Company EN 10-012
 Don Quixote - Donald Pleasence and The Atlas Theatre Company EN 10-013
 Puss in Boots - Cyril Shaps and The Atlas Theatre Company EN 10-014
 Treasure Island - James Kenney EN 10-015
 Beauty and the Beast - Cyril Shaps and The Atlas Theatre Company EN 10-016
 Bluebeard - Marjorie Westbury EN 10-017
 Brave Little Tailor - Donald Pleasence and The Atlas Theatre Company EN 10-018
 Sleeping Beauty - Denise Bryer EN 10-019
 Snow White - Marjorie Westbury and The Atlas Theatre Company EN 10-020
 Pinocchio - Maggie Smith EN 10-021
 William Tell - Paul Daneman EN 10-022
 The Adventures of Baron Munchhausen - William Devlin and the Atlas Theatre Company EN 10-023
 The Story of Chopin - Robert Hardy EN 10-024
 The Count of Monte Cristo - Paul Daneman and The Atlas Theatre Company EN 10-025
 The Story of Mozart - Alec McCowen EN 10-026
 Little Red Riding Hood - Judith Stott EN 10-027
 The Story of Beethoven - William Devlin EN 10-028
 Robinson Crusoe - William Devlin and the Atlas Theatre Company EN 10-029
 Nursery Rhymes EN 10-030

History
United Artists released the 30 original stories in the US in 1962. The recording labels changed when Liberty Records (its budget subsidiary Sunset Records) and United Artists Records  merged in 1968 after Transamerica bought Liberty. All labels were merged under United Artists in 1971. When Liberty was deactivated in 1971 (for the first time) both the Sunset and Talespinners series were leased by Springboard International and in the case of the Talespinners series they used the same catalog numbers until 1975. When Springboard International Records went bankrupt 1984 Gusto Records acquired some of their catalogues from Jay-Koala.

MusicTale Spinners for Children used classical music as background and linking music in their productions.  Examples of this include:
 Robin Hood (UAC 11001) - Violin Concerto in E minor by Felix Mendelssohn
 William Tell (UAC 11002) - William Tell Overture and Overture from La Gazza Ladra by Gioachino Rossini
 The Three Musketeers (UAC 11007) - "The Dance of the Furies" from Orfeo ed Euridice by Christoph Gluck
 Treasure Island (UAC 11013) - Symphonie fantastique by Hector Berlioz (also used in "Hiawatha" [UAC 11054]) Sinbad the Sailor (UAC 110020) - Scheherazade by Nikolai Rimsky-Korsakov (also used in "Ali Baba and the Forty Thieves" [UAC 11018] and "Aladdin and the Magic Lamp" [UAC 11019]) Rip Van Winkle (UAC 11034) - Overture for A Midsummer Night's Dream by Felix Mendelssohn
 Christopher Columbus (UAC 11040) - Symphony No. 9 - "From the New World" by Antonín Dvořák
 The Little Mermaid (UAC 11042) - Piano Concerto in A minor by Edvard Grieg
 The Count of Monte Cristo'' (UAC 11044) - Symphony No. 6 by Pyotr Ilyich Tchaikovsky

See also

 List of fairytale fantasies—for modern retellings
 Storytelling

References

External links
 Children's Vinyl Records Tale Spinners for Children

Collections of fairy tales
Lists of books
Storytelling
American record labels
Series of children's books
Compilation album series
United Artists Records